The Swindlers, aka Los Mangantes, is a 1963 Italian comedy film written and directed by Lucio Fulci, starring Franco and Ciccio.

Plot
The film takes place in a court of law and is divided into an anthology format, spotlighting four criminal cases. The defendants consist of the following: a wealthy industrialist charged with fraud, two nuns who have gotten in trouble with the guardian of their order, the president of a football team implicated in illegal sporting activities, and two Sicilian businessmen who conned come investors into believing they have discovered an archaeological find.

Cast 
Walter Chiari: dott. Mario Corti
Antonella Lualdi: Sister Celestina 
Raimondo Vianello: Tabanelli
Franco Franchi: Salvatore Di Carmine/ Rizzo/ Sposito
Ciccio Ingrassia: Napoleone Palumbo/ Nostradomine/ Roccanera
Luciana Gilli: Liliana Ferri
Elio Crovetto: Gustav Schultz 
Xenia Valderi: Lilliana's mother
Aroldo Tieri: Oscar Taverna
Dominique Boschero: Oscar's Wife
Umberto D'Orsi:  Lucarini
Pietro De Vico: chancellor
Mario Scaccia: Mario's attorney
Camillo Mastrocinque: Spianelli's attorney
Seyna Seyn : Chinese girl
Oreste Lionello : supermarket manager
Claudio Gora : Spianelli
 Alberto Bonucci: The President
Margaret Lee:  Adelina

References

External links

1963 films
Films directed by Lucio Fulci
Films scored by Carlo Rustichelli
Italian comedy films
1963 comedy films
1960s Italian-language films
1960s Italian films